Blockhouse fort may refer to various blockhouse forts including:

Blockhouse, Washington, a town named after a fort
Fort Blockhouse, in Hampshire, England.
West Blockhouse Fort in Pembrokeshire, Wales
The blockhouse fort central to the Battle of Seattle (1856)